Lakshmi Persaud is a Trinidad-born, British-based writer who resides in London, England. She is the author of five novels: Butterfly in the Wind (1990), Sastra (1993), For the Love of My Name (2000), Raise the Lanterns High (2004) and Daughters of Empire (2012).

Personal life
She was born in 1939 in the small village of Streatham Lodge, later called Pasea Village, in what was then still rural Tunapuna, Trinidad. Her forefathers, Hindus from Uttar Pradesh, moved from India to the Caribbean in the 1890s. Both her parents were in the retail business.

She attended the Tunapuna Government Primary School, St. Augustine Girls' High School and St. Joseph’s Convent, Port of Spain.

She left Trinidad in 1957 to study for a B.A. and her Ph.D. at Queen's University Belfast, Northern Ireland and her postgraduate Diploma in Education at University of Reading, United Kingdom. Her doctoral thesis was "The Need for and the Possibilities of Agricultural Diversification in Barbados, West Indies"  

Dr. Lakshmi Persaud is the wife of economist Professor Bishnodat Persaud, with whom she moved to the United Kingdom in 1974. She has three children, psychiatrist Rajendra Persaud, financial economist Professor Avinash Persaud, and Sharda Dean. She has lived mainly in the UK since the 1970s, with a two-year spell in Jamaica in the 1990s.

Career 

Dr. Persaud taught at various schools in the Caribbean including St. Augustine Girl's High School, Bishop Anstey High School and Tunapuna Hindu School in Trinidad, Queen's College in Guyana, and Harrison College and The St. Michael School in Barbados.

After leaving teaching she became a freelance journalist. Persaud wrote articles on socio-economic concerns for newspapers and magazines for many years. She also read and simultaneously recorded books in Philosophy, Economics and Literature for the Royal National Institute for the Blind in London.		
She began a new career in the late 1980s writing fiction. Her short story "See Saw Margery Daw" was broadcast by the BBC World Service on Saturday 18 and Sunday 19 November 1995.

Works 
She has published five novels that have been frequently reviewed and discussed in a number of academic  publications.

Butterfly in the Wind, Leeds, England: Peepal Tree Press, 1990.
Sastra, Leeds, England: Peepal Tree Press, 1993.
For the Love of My Name, Leeds, England: Peepal Tree Press, 2000.
Raise the Lanterns High, London: BlackAmber Publishers, 2004.
 translated into Italian as  Tenete alte le lanterne, Rome: 66thand2nd, 2010.
Daughters of Empire, Leeds, England: Peepal Tree Press, 2012.

Persaud’s novels deal with the intricacies of Caribbean identity and individual and communal memory.
			
Her first novel Butterfly in the Wind was published by Peepal Tree Press in 1990, and in it Persaud records the mental conflicts that attending a Catholic school caused for a Hindu girl. The novel deals in an imaginatively autobiographical way with the first 18 years of her life. Persaud records that her reading of Edmund Gosse’s Father and Son: A Study of Two Temperaments and Laurie Lee’s Cider with Rosie were significant influences in writing this book.

It was followed by her second novel, Sastra, which was published in 1993 also by Peepal Tree Press. In one of the episodes, Persaud draws on her tertiary experience. Both novels explore the tensions within Hinduism between the somewhat puritanical, patriarchal forms orthodox Hinduism took in the Trinidad of her childhood and youth and its latent capacity for a sensuous embrace of life.

In October 1994, the Trinidad Guardian published the bestseller list for Caribbean books published abroad. Sastra was placed first on the list and Butterfly in the Wind was fifth.

Following extensive visits to Guyana (the birthplace of her husband), she wrote For the Love of My Name, published by Peepal Tree Press in 2000, a novel which moves far from the more familiar domestic Hindu territory of the earlier two novels. Though the fictional island of Maya draws heavily on the actuality of Guyana from the mid-1960s to the 1980s, it has resonances for states throughout the world where political repression and ethnic conflict have gone hand in hand.

In March 2004, Raise the Lanterns High was published by BlackAmber Publishers and in 2012, Persaud's fifth novel, Daughters of Empire, was published by Peepal Tree Press.

There has been increasing recognition of Lakshmi Persaud’s work by academic institutions. Her novels are being used as texts in Caribbean and post-colonial literature courses in a number of universities and extracts from her novels have been used in English exams in the Caribbean.

Awards 

In recognition of her work, Warwick University established a 'Lakshmi Persaud Research Fellowship' at its Centre for Translation and Comparative Cultural Studies.

In 2012, in recognition of the 50th Anniversary of the Independence of Trinidad and Tobago, the National Library and Information System Authority (NALIS) awarded Lakshmi Persaud with a Lifetime Literary Award for her significant contribution to the development of Trinidad and Tobago’s Literature.

In October 2013, Persaud was conferred with an Honorary Doctorate, Doctor of Letters (D.Litt.), by The University of the West Indies, St. Augustine, in recognition of her literary contributions.

References

External links
Home page
Publisher's Author Biography page

Trinidad and Tobago people of Indian descent
Living people
Trinidad and Tobago women novelists
Trinidad and Tobago novelists
Trinidad and Tobago Hindus
1939 births
Trinidad and Tobago emigrants to the United Kingdom
British people of Indo-Trinidadian descent